The 2018 Moscow Oblast gubernatorial election was held on 9 September 2018. To be elected outright, a candidate needed more than 50% of votes; if no-one achieved 50%, a runoff between the top two candidates would have been held 14 days later. Andrey Vorobyov, the incumbent governor, took 62% of the vote, and was thus re-elected for a new term.

Candidates
Six candidates were registered to participate in the election.

Other candidates

Results

|- style="background-color:#E9E9E9;text-align:center;"
! style="text-align:left;" colspan="2" rowspan="2"| Candidate
! style="text-align:left;" rowspan="2" colspan="2"| Party
! colspan="2"| 1st round
|- style="background-color:#E9E9E9;text-align:center;"
! width="75"|Votes
! width="30"|%
|-
| style="background-color:;"|
| style="text-align:left;"| Andrey Vorobyov
| style="text-align:left;"| United Russia
| UR
| 
| 62.52%
|-
| style="background-color:;"|
| style="text-align:left;"| Konstantin Cheremisov
| style="text-align:left;"| Communist Party
| CPRF
| 
| 12.99%
|-
| style="background-color:#32CD32;"|
| style="text-align:left;"| Liliya Belova
| style="text-align:left;"| Green Alliance
| GA
| 
| 7.51%
|-
| style="background-color:;"|
| style="text-align:left;"| Kirill Zhigarev
| style="text-align:left;"| Liberal Democratic Party
| LDPR
| 
| 5.77%
|-
| style="background-color:;"|
| style="text-align:left;"| Igor Chistyukhin 
| style="text-align:left;"| A Just Russia
| JR
| 
| 4.63%
|-
| style="background-color:;"|
| style="text-align:left;"| Boris Nadezhdin
| style="text-align:left;"| Party of Growth
| PG
| 
|  4.36%
|-
| style="background-color:#E9E9E9;" colspan="8"|
|-
| style="text-align:left;" colspan="4"| Valid votes
| 
| 97.78%
|-
| style="text-align:left;" colspan="4"| Blank ballots
| 
| 2.22%
|-
| style="text-align:left;" colspan="4"| Turnout
| 
| 38.51%
|-
| style="text-align:left;" colspan="4"| Registered voters
| 
| style="background-color:#E9E9E9;"|
|-
| style="text-align:left;font-size:90%;" colspan="8"|
Official results
|}

References

Moscow Oblast
Governors of Moscow Oblast
September 2018 events in Russia